Micro Electronics, Inc. (MEI) is an American privately owned corporation headquartered in Hilliard, Ohio. Founded in 1979 by John Baker, it serves as the parent company of the computer retailer Micro Center, its online division Micro Center Online, and its brand iPSG, which houses PowerSpec PC, WinBook, and Inland(including Inland Premium for high-end SSDs).

References 

Consumer electronics retailers in the United States
Consumer electronics retailers
Consumer electronics
Computer companies of the United States
Home computer hardware companies
American companies established in 1979
Computer companies established in 1979
Electronics companies established in 1979
Retail companies established in 1979
Online retailers of the United States
Privately held companies based in Ohio
1979 establishments in Ohio
Companies based in the Columbus, Ohio metropolitan area